The Syro-Malabar Catholic Eparchy of Chanda is an eparchy (Eastern Catholic  diocese) of the East Syriac Rite Syro-Malabar Catholic Church, yet suffragan of the Latin Metropolitan Roman Catholic Archdiocese of Nagpur.

Its cathedral episcopal see is St. Thomas Cathedral, in Ballarpur, in India's Maharashtra state.

History 
 It was created on 29 July 1968 as Apostolic Exarchate of Chanda, a pre-diocesan Eastern Catholic missionary jurisdiction, on then Latin territories, split off from its present Metropolitan, the Roman Catholic Archdiocese of Nagpur, and from the Roman Catholic Diocese of Amravati. 
 Promoted as Eparchy of Chanda on 26 February 1977 by the Bull Nostra Ipsorum of Pope Paul VI, promoting its Exarch to become the first Eparch (bishop).  
 Lost territory on 23 June 1999 to establish the Syro-Malabar Catholic Eparchy of Adilabad (a suffragan of the Latin Roman Catholic Archdiocese of Hyderabad)

Ordinaries 
Apostolic Exarch of Chanda
 Januarius Paul Palathuruthy, Carmelites of Mary Immaculate (C.M.I.) ( July 1968 – 26 February 1977 see below)

Suffragan Eparchs (Bishops) of Chanda
 Januarius Palathuruthy, C.M.I. (see above, 26 February 1977 – retired 20 April 1990) 
 Mar Vijay Anand Nedumpuram, C.M.I. (20 April 1990 – retired 31 July 2014), previously Prior General of Carmelites of Mary Immaculate (1985 – 1990.04.20)
 Mar  Ephrem Nariculam (31 July 2014 – ...), of the Syro-Malabar Archeparchy of Ernakulam-Angamaly, previously Chaplain of the Syro-Malabar Community in Toronto, Ontario, Canada, and Coordinator of Priestly Formation at a Seminary and as a Lecturer in Theology in the city.

References

External links 
 Syro-Malabar Catholic Diocese of Chanda
 Syro-Malabar Catholic Diocese of Chanda at Catholic-Hierarchy

Syro-Malabar Catholic dioceses
Christian organizations established in 1977
Christianity in Maharashtra
1977 establishments in Maharashtra